The British West Indies Regiment was a unit of the British Army during the First World War, formed from volunteers from British colonies in the West Indies.

Formation

In 1915 the British Army formed a second West Indies regiment from Caribbean volunteers who had made their way to Britain. Initially, these volunteers were drafted into a variety of units within the army, but in 1915 it was decided to group them together into a single regiment, named the British West Indies Regiment. The similarity of titles has sometimes led to confusion between this war-time unit and the long established West India Regiment. Both were recruited from black Caribbean volunteers and a number of officers from the WIR were transferred to the BWIR.

The 1st Battalion was formed in September 1915 at Seaford, Sussex, England. It was made up of men from:
British Guiana—A Company.
Trinidad—B Company.
Trinidad and St Vincent—C Company.
Grenada and Barbados—D Company.

A further ten battalions were formed afterwards. High wastage led to further drafts being required from Jamaica, British Honduras and Barbados before the regiment was able to begin training. In total 15,600 men served in the British West Indies Regiment. Jamaica contributed two-thirds of these volunteers, while others came from Trinidad and Tobago, Barbados, the Bahamas, British Honduras (now Belize), Grenada, British Guiana (now Guyana), the Leeward Islands, Saint Lucia and St Vincent. Nearly 5,000 more subsequently volunteered.

The battalions of the regiment included:

 1st Btn (formed 1 October 1915)
 2nd Btn (formed 1 January 1916)
 3rd Btn (formed 7 January 1916)
 4th Btn (formed 31 May 1916)
 5th Btn (formed as a reserve battalion on 7 August 1916, converted to infantry by April 1918)
 6th Btn (formed 30 March 1917)
 7th Btn (formed 31 March 1917)
 8th Btn (formed 7 July 1917)
 9th Btn (formed 21 July 1917)
 10th Btn (formed 26 August 1917)
 11th Btn (formed 2 October 1917)
 12th Btn (formed 8 December 1917)
 Reserve Btn (formed April 1918)

Wartime service

The British West Indies Regiment played a significant role in the First World War especially in Palestine and Jordan where they were employed in military operations against the Ottoman Army. During the Palestine Campaign General Allenby sent the following telegram to the then Governor of Jamaica William Henry Manning: "I have great pleasure in informing you of the gallant conduct of the machine-gun section of the 1st British West Indies Regiment during two successful raids on the Turkish trenches. All ranks behaved with great gallantry under heavy rifle and shell fire and contributed in no small measure to the success of the operations".

While the 1st and 2nd Battalions served mainly in Egypt and Palestine, the 3rd, 4th, 6th and 7th Battalions served in France and Flanders, with the 5th Battalion acting as reserve draft unit. The 8th and 9th Battalions also served in France and Flanders, before being transferred to Italy in 1918, while the 10th and 11th Battalions also served in France and Italy.

Taranto revolt
Following the Armistice in November 1918 the battalions of the BWIR were concentrated at Taranto, Italy, to prepare for demobilisation. However they were still required to work; loading and unloading ships, performing labour fatigues, and building and cleaning latrines for white soldiers, all of which caused resentment, especially when they discovered that white soldiers had been awarded a pay rise which they were not. Finally, on 6 December 1918, the men of the 9th Battalion refused to obey orders, and 180 sergeants signed a petition complaining about poor pay, allowances, and promotions. On 9 December the 10th Battalion also refused to work. Over a period of four days a black NCO was killed and a lieutenant colonel assaulted. In response, men of the Worcestershire Regiment were sent in to restore order. The 9th Battalion was disbanded and its personnel redistributed to other battalions, which were disarmed. Around 60 men were tried for mutiny, generally receiving sentences from three to five years, although one man received 20 years, and another was executed by firing squad. 

Bitterness persisted after the mutiny was suppressed, and on 17 December 1918 about 60 NCOs of the BWIR met to form the Caribbean League, calling for equal rights, self-determination and closer union in the West Indies. At a meeting on 20 December, a sergeant of the 3rd Battalion stated that "the black man should have freedom and govern himself in the West Indies and that if necessary, force and bloodshed should be used to attain that object".

Awards
During World War I the BWIR was awarded 81 medals for bravery and 49 men were mentioned in despatches.

See also
 African-Caribbean leftism
 George Blackman
 Gershom Browne
 Arthur Andrew Cipriani
 John Daley
 Sam Manning
 Stanley Stair
 Clennell Wickham

Further reading
 
 
 
 
 
 J. B. M. Frederick, Lineage Book of British Land Forces 1660–1978, Volume I, 1984: Microform Academic Publishers, Wakefield, United Kingdom.

References

External links

 
 
 

Regiments of the British Army in World War I
Military units and formations established in 1915
Military units and formations disestablished in 1921
British Caribbean